In Australia, what is considered the third tier of Rugby is often referred to as club rugby, grade rugby or premier rugby. Club Rugby often focuses on the major metropolitan areas of the respective unions, with teams representing various districts and suburbs. The teams represented in the first grade can and have changed over time, and are open to change at the discretion of the governing body.

Sydney Premiership

The Shute Shield is a rugby union competition in Sydney, New South Wales. It is the premier grade rugby trophy in Sydney rugby. The shield is contested by 11 Sydney Rugby Union clubs and one from Newcastle and Hunter Rugby Union.

The first Sydney club competition was held in 1874, contested by Balmain, Newington College, University of Sydney and The King's School, Parramatta. The Shute Shield is seen as the traditional successor to this competition.

The shield was donated to the New South Wales Rugby Union in 1923 by Sydney University Football Club, and was named in honour of Robert Elliott Stewart Shute who died while playing for The Rest v NSW XV on 5 June 1922.

Current clubs

Queensland Premier Rugby

Queensland Premier Rugby is the top club competition in Queensland. Nine clubs take part: eight from Brisbane and a club each from the Gold Coast.

The first club rugby competition in Queensland was the Hospital Football Challenge, which began in 1899. It was an annual fund-raising venture for the Brisbane Hospital, but the game fell away during and after WWI, and rugby union was abandoned in Queensland after 1919.

The competition was restored in 1929 and the original trophy, the magnificent Hospital Cup became the premiership trophy again. It is now awarded to the winner of the Premier Rugby grand final.

ACTRU Premier Division 

The ACTRU Premier Division is the top rugby club competition in Canberra. It is conducted by the region's governing body, the ACT and Southern NSW Rugby Union.

The competition was first held in 1938. There are currently, six ACT clubs that compete in the top division. The trophy awarded to the winner of the grand final is the John I Dent Cup, named after the benefactor who donated it to the union.  All of the finals are played at Viking Park.

RugbyWA Premier Grade 

The RugbyWA Premier Grade is contested by 14 teams from the Greater Perth Area.

The teams currently in the RugbyWA Premier Grade are:

Victorian Premier Division

The Dewar Shield is contested by 8 teams from the Greater Melbourne Area.

South Australian Premier Grade

The Cooper Premier Grade is contested by 9 teams.

As of 2018, there are fourteen clubs which make up RUSA, eleven of these clubs field senior men's sides, eight field senior women's sides and 11 field junior sides. There is also a golden oldies club for players 35+, and a rugby sevens club for women and girls (12+).

Tasmanian Division One

As at the end of 2019, there are 13 clubs which make up the TRU. Teams currently in the Tasmanian Division One are:

Ten of these clubs field senior men's sides, eight field senior women's sides, and five field junior sides. There is also a "golden oldies" club for players aged 35+.

Darwin First Grade

The First Grade competition is contested by 5 teams from the Darwin area.

Casuarina Cougars
Darwin Dragons
Palmerstown Crocs
South Darwin Rabbitohs
University Pirates

Newcastle and Hunter Rugby Union Premiership 

The Newcastle and Hunter Rugby Union is based around the NSW city of Newcastle, located ~160 km north of Sydney.

The earliest report of a football match in Newcastle was in 1860, when '''a lover of the old English games has offered one of Mrs. O’Hagan’s most fashionable bonnets as a prize to the fortunate party who shall give the winning (final) kick in a game of foot-ball, to be played on the new cricket ground, near St. John's Church. A precursor to the formation of a local union, the Raysmith Challenge Cup was commenced in 1887 and was contested by Newcastle, Waratah, Advance, Orientals, Union, Ferndale, West Maitland, Raymond Terrace, East Maitland Imperial, Singleton and East Maitland clubs.

In 1888 the Northern Branch of the NSW Rugby Football Union was established, later renamed the Newcastle Rugby Union. The competition was suspended during World War 1, reforming in 1925.  The 1925 competition comprised  Cook's Hill Old Boys, Newcastle High School Old Boys, Great Public Schools' Old Boys (later Wanderers), Lysaght's Limited, Northern Suburbs and Mayfield. The NHRU currently sponsors Premier Rugby, Divisional Men’s, Social Men’s, Women’s, Juniors and Schools competitions. The 2019 Premier Rugby competition was contested by nine clubs across 3 men’s grades.Premier Rugby Clubs in the NHRU (2019)'''

See also

List of Australian rugby union stadiums by capacity
List of Australian rugby union teams

References

Notes

 
Competitions
Lists of sports events in Australia